Richard Gregory Rieker (born November 9, 1961) is an American former professional baseball umpire, who is the Director of Umpire Development for Major League Baseball (MLB).

Career
Rieker spent thirteen seasons as a minor league umpire. Rieker made major league appearances as early as 1992 and he joined the National League full-time in 1996, after the death of John McSherry. Rieker worked throughout both major leagues in 2000 and 2001. He wore uniform number 16 during his National League career, then switched to number 38 after the National League and American League umpiring staffs merged in 2000.

Rieker umpired 1,001 regular season major league games in his 10-year career. He umpired in two division series (1999 and 2000), and the 1998 All-Star Game. Rieker was behind the plate when Mark McGwire hit his record-setting 69th and 70th home runs on September 27, 1998.

Rieker has worked in supervisory roles for Major League Baseball since his 2001 retirement as an active umpire. In 2011, he became the MLB Director of Umpire Development.

Personal life
Rieker has an undergraduate degree in business from the University of Missouri–St. Louis. He lives in Orlando, Florida, with his wife and two children.

See also 

 List of Major League Baseball umpires

References

External links
 Umpire Card
 Retrosheet

1961 births
Living people
Major League Baseball umpires
Sportspeople from St. Louis